"Off the Books" is the third single from Stone Crazy, a 1997 album by East Coast hip hop group The Beatnuts. It was released by Relativity Records in both 12 inch and CD format in 1997. The song is produced by The Beatnuts and features raps by Juju and Psycho Les, the first on-record performance by Cuban Link, and a notable early verse from Big Punisher. (Big Pun's first on-record performance was the B-Side to Fat Joe's "Envy" single, "Firewater" with Fat Joe, Raekwon and Armageddon.) Lyrics from Psycho Les's verse were later sampled in "The Rep Grows Bigga" by Gang Starr and two Beatnuts songs: "No Escapin' This" and "Slam Pit". The track's beat samples "Break that Party and Opening" by Melvin Van Peebles, "Sign Song" by Buddy Baker, "Get out of My Life, Woman" by George Semper and "Hihache" by Lafayette Afro Rock Band.

"Off the Books" was the most commercially successful single from Stone Crazy; it reached #86 on the Billboard Hot 100 making it the first Beatnuts single to appear on the pop chart. Tom Doggett of RapReviews.com explains the source of the song's success: 
Its popularity landed it on two Beatnuts hits compilations: Beatnuts Forever and Classic Nuts, Vol. 1. It can additionally be found on the soundtracks of two films, 1998's Butter and 2001's Blazin''', as well as Big Pun's 2001 album Endangered Species'' and various hip hop compilation albums.

An "Off the Books" music video, which highlights the lavish lives lived by each rapper, also on the video, Angie Martinez & Fat Joe appeared together at the restaurant. This video was directed by Chris Robinson.

Single track list

CD single
 "Off the Books (Album Version)"
 "Off the Books (Instrumental)"
 "Bless the M.I.C."
 "Intermission"
 "Get Funky (Remix)"

12" vinyl

A-Side
 "Off the Books (Clean Version)" (3:34)
 "Off the Books (Dirty Version)" (3:34)

B-Side
 "Off the Books (T.V. Track)" (3:34)
 "Off the Books (Instrumental)" (3:34)
 "Off the Books (Acapella)" (3:25)

Charts

References

Off the Books
Off the Books
Big Pun songs
Cuban Link songs
Relativity Records singles
1997 songs